Achkarren is part of the town of Vogtsburg im Kaiserstuhl, a small town in the German Kaiserstuhl region, and is located in the southernmost part of the town. It also borders the town of Ihringen. The valley of Achkarren faces west and is 5 km from the Rhine river and 7 km from Breisach. The German temperature hotspot (highest average temperature) is located between the center of Achkarren and the town of Ihringen.

History 
The first documented reference of Achkarren happened in 1064 AD when the village was given to the cloister of Ottmarsheim (a small Town in Alsace) by King Heinrich IV. Based on archeological artifacts the village could have been settled as early as two thousand years ago. The omnipresent wine terraces might have first been established during the settlement by the Alemanni from 260 AD on. The name "Achkarren" is deduced from the old high German "haz karle" (Hate Charles), supposedly the name of an early settler from the neighboring village of Oberrotweil.

Town folks tell a tale about the origin of the name of the village:
During the construction of the castle Hoehingen on the Schlossberg (Castle Mountain) high about the village an accident occurred. A cart full of building material was pushed up the mountain several times. Every time the cart was close to the summit it escaped and rolled back down into the valley. While watching this unfortunate spectacle the future lord of the castle shouted "Ach Karren!" (Oh Cart).

A first destruction of the castle happened 1525 during the German Peasants' War. After rebuilding the final destruction happened during the Thirty Years' War.  The Kaiser's catholic troops destroyed it once they could not hold up the attack from the Swedes. Until today artifacts of ruins can be found. Three years after the 30-year-long war seized the village had only a population of 58 left. This means approximately 70% of population was killed during this war. In 1703 AD, during the siege of Breisach by French troops, the village was completely destroyed. This siege was part of the War of the Spanish Succession. In the chaos of wars between the late medieval and modern times, Achkarren as well as its neighboring towns of Ihringen and Breisach were several times part of France for some years.

A quarry is located between the Schlossberg mountain and the Buechsenberg mountain. For the construction of the St. Stephansmuenster (cathedral) in Breisach material from this quarry was used. Recently the quarry was revived in order to repair said cathedral.

Miscellaneous 
The vineyards of Achkarren are considered part of the best in Germany. In particular the local Ruländer or Grauburgunder (Pinot grigio) respectively is famous. The vintners cooperative society of Achkarren and the wineries of the village have been receiving many prices for the quality of these wines. Besides the loess soil Achkarren has over 50% of volcanic soil.

There are several trails dug into the soil in the Schlossberg as well as the Schneckenberg (Snail Mountain). In these trails one can witness the layers of volcanic rock that is covered with a thin layer of loess at the top.

Achkarren contain the nature preserve called Buechsenberg which contains a collection of seldom plants and wildlife. A Museum about winemaking is also located in Achkarren. Further the village boasts a 2.4 km long trail that features the geology of winemaking, its soil, climate, grape variety and the history of winemaking of the Kaisersuhl.

Besides wine making, tourism as well as small industrial park in the Rhine Rift are the main businesses of the village.

References

Gallery 

Former municipalities in Baden-Württemberg
Breisgau-Hochschwarzwald
Baden